Your Secret Love is the tenth studio album by American R&B recording artist Luther Vandross, released by Epic in October 1996. The album's title track won the Best Male R&B Vocal Performance and was nominated for Best R&B Song at the 39th Grammy Awards in 1997. The album served as his final album under the Epic label after being part of the record label for fifteen years.

Track listing

Personnel 
 Luther Vandross – lead vocals, vocal arrangements, arrangements (1, 5, 8), backing vocals (6)
 Reed Vertelney – keyboards (1, 5), string programming (1), bass (1, 5), drum programming (1), arrangements (1, 5), drums (5), strings (5)
 John "Skip" Anderson – additional keyboards (1), strings (1, 3), bass (1, 2, 3), arrangements (1, 5, 8), keyboards (2), synth strings (2), drums (2, 3, 8), acoustic piano (3), synthesizers (8), synth orchestra and arrangements (8), 
 Ivan Hampden Jr. – additional programming (1), drums (9, 10), percussion (9)
 Marcus Miller – all instruments (4, 6), programming (4, 6, 7), arrangements (4, 6, 7), backing vocals (6), keyboards (7), guitar (7), bass (8, 10)
 David Ward – additional programming (4), programming (7)
 Nat Adderley Jr. – vibraphone solo (7), acoustic piano (8, 10), arrangements (8, 9, 10), keyboards (9), synth bass (9)
 Paul Jackson Jr. – guitar (1, 2, 3, 5, 8, 9, 10), additional guitar (4), acoustic guitar (7)
 Yogi Horton – drums (8)
 Paulinho da Costa – percussion (2, 3, 5, 8)
 Kirk Whalum – saxophone solo (10)
 Leon Pendarvis – string arrangements (2, 4)
 Alfred Brown – music contractor (4, 9, 10)
 Tawatha Agee – backing vocals (1-5, 7, 10)
 Paulette McWilliams – backing vocals (1-5, 7, 10)
 Cindy Mizelle – backing vocals (1-5, 7, 10)
 Brenda White-King – backing vocals (1-5, 7, 10)
 Lisa Fischer – backing vocals (2, 4), lead vocals (8)
 David Lasley – backing vocals (2)
 Cheryl Lynn – backing vocals (2)
 Cissy Houston – backing vocals (4, 10)
 Deidra "Spin" Roper – rap (7)
 Fonzi Thornton – backing vocals (10), vocal contractor

Production 
 Luther Vandross – producer, executive producer 
 Marcus Miller – producer (4, 6, 7)
 Nat Adderley Jr. – producer (9, 10)
 Ray Bardani – recording (1, 2, 3, 5, 8, 9, 10), mixing 
 David Ward – recording (4, 6, 7)
 Al Schmitt – orchestra recording
 Mike Baumgartner – assistant engineer
 Kyle Bess – assistant engineer
 Greg Denon – assistant engineer
 Mark Eshelman – assistant engineer 
 Paul Falcone – assistant engineer 
 Sue McLean – assistant engineer 
 Pat Weber – assistant engineer 
 Max Risenhoover – digital editing, sound designer (1, 2, 3, 5, 8, 9, 10)
 Ted Jensen – mastering 
 Bibi Green – production coordinator (for Marcus Miller)
 Pat Dorn – album coordinator 
 George Corsillo – art direction, design
 Norman Jean Roy – photography 
 Guzman (Connie Hansen and Russell Peacock) – front cover photography 
 The Marsha Burns Co. / Gallin-Morey Associates – management 
 Max Szadek – personal assistant

Studios 
 Recorded at Camel Island Studios (Los Angeles, California) and Sony Scoring Stage (Culver City, California).
 Mixed at The Hit Factory (New York City, New York).
 Mastered at Sterling Sound (New York City, New York).

Charts

Weekly charts

Year-end charts

Certifications

References

1996 albums
Epic Records albums
Luther Vandross albums
Albums produced by Luther Vandross
Albums produced by Marcus Miller